D&B Software (Dun & Bradstreet Software Services) was formed by the merger of the Management Science America and McCormack & Dodge companies in June 1990, under the ownership of the Dun & Bradstreet corporation. In 1982, McCormack & Dodge was described by The New York Times as "one of the nation's top three financial software concerns."

Overview
After the merger, the separate company headquarters, located in Massachusetts and Atlanta, were retained with videoconferencing used for communication. Originally, the merged company was a supplier of financial packages that ran on mainframe computers. In 1991, they released the client-server middleware application suite named SmartStream that ran on HP-UX. Smartstream 3.0 was introduced in early 1995.

Geac
In 1996, D&B Software was acquired by the Canadian client-server application firm Geac Computer Corporation for US$150 million, who immediately split the services into two divisions.

See also
 Informatics General

References

Defunct software companies of the United States
Dun & Bradstreet